The Beriev Be-2500 Neptun (Russian: Бериев Бе-2500 Нептун) is a super heavy amphibious transport aircraft that, as of 2007, was in design and development by Russian design firm Beriev. The maximum takeoff weight is estimated at 2500 tons, hence its name.

Design and development
It has been designed to serve both as a conventional jet aircraft, flying at high altitudes transcontinentally, as well as a craft using the ground-effect at intercontinental routes across the sea. It is planned to fly via intercontinental routes, taking off from normal seaports without needing special infrastructure. The concept is thought to have some connection with the Lun-class ekranoplan of the 1970s.

If it entered service, it would become the new largest airplane in the world.

The concept of the aircraft was developed in the 1980s by the Beriev Design Office in collaboration with TsAGI and TsIAM. There are two versions of the design that differ in the arrangement of the gear units and in the geometric design of the dragon structure. Initially, the NK-116 engine was designed to be installed, but foreign engines were also introduced, including the Rolls-Royce Trent 800 and General Electric GE. The NK-116 plans were developed by Samara (Kuznetsov Design Office) by 1994. Beriev is planning to cooperate with foreign partners in the development of the aircraft, including financing issues. It was estimated in 2007 that the cost of a development program would reach $ 10–15 billion.

The company claims that such aircraft would operate as a "flying ship" that would compete with the shipping and air transport industries and could easily be integrated into the existing infrastructure.

Specifications (Be-2500)

See also
Aerocon Dash 1.6 wingship
Boeing Pelican
TTS-IS

References 

Soviet and Russian Ekranoplans, Sergey Komissarov and Yefim Gordon, Ian Allan Publishing Midland, Pages 192 - 199. 

Be-2500
Ekranoplans
Six-engined jet aircraft
Twin-tail aircraft